Stieglitz is a rural residential locality in the local government area (LGA) of Break O'Day in the North-east LGA region of Tasmania. The 2016 census recorded a population of 561 for the state suburb of Stieglitz.

History 
Stieglitz was gazetted as a locality in 1964. The name was in use by 1855. 

The name comes from a pioneer family named Von Stieglitz.

Geography
The waters of the Tasman Sea form the eastern boundary, and Georges Bay the western. St Helens Airport is within the locality.

Road infrastructure 
Route C851 (St Helens Point Road) passes through from south-west to north-west.

References

Towns in Tasmania
Localities of Break O'Day Council